In 2016–2017 ten clubs competed for the title. The season ran from October 2016 to June 2017. The first round of matches took place at the Stade Gilbert Brutus in Perpignan where the ten clubs played over the weekend called "Magic Weekend 1" this was followed by 18 rounds home and away matches before a second Magic Weekend as the last round of games. The top six clubs then progressed into the end of season play-offs to determine the champions. The league saw the return of Saint-Gaudens Bears following their promotion.

Table 

Points : victory : 3, defeat with less than 12 points : 1 (point bonus), defeat with more than 12 points : 0.

Results 

 Magic Weekend 1 (Round 1)                                   

 Toulouse Olympique Broncos 10-16 Saint-Gaudens Bears            
 RC Albi 22-24 Villeneuve Leopards                             
 Lézignan Sangliers 30-26 Saint-Esteve XIII Catalan                
 Palau XIII Broncos 4-44 SO Avignon
 AS Carcassonne 16-40 Limoux Grizzlies

 Magic Weekend 2 (Round 20)

 Villeneuve Leopards 12-42 Saint-Gaudens Bears
 SO Avignon 64-28 RC Albi
 Lézignan Sangliers 38-36 Limoux Grizzlies
 Palau XIII Broncos 49-16 Toulouse Olympique Broncos
 AS Carcassonne 24-35 Saint-Esteve XIII Catalan

Grand Final 

 Limoux Grizzlies 24-22
 Lézignan Sangliers 
Parc des sports, Narbonne 
Crowd: 8,270

References

External links 
 Official website of the Fédération française de rugby à XIII.

Rugby league competitions in France
2016 in French rugby league
2017 in French rugby league